Upper Shelton is a hamlet located in the Central Bedfordshire district of Bedfordshire, England.

Upper Shelton contains a public house called "The Exhibition" (with a trojan horse in its back garden). There is also a lower school called "Shelton Lower School", and a butchers shop, village farm, and several bed and breakfast establishments.

The settlement is close to Cranfield, Stewartby and Marston Moreteyne. Upper Shelton (along with Lower Shelton) forms part of the Marston Moreteyne civil parish. The nearest large town to Upper Shelton is Bedford.

Hamlets in Bedfordshire
Central Bedfordshire District